Administrative Council elections were held in Dahomey in 1932.

Electoral system
Three members of the Administrative Council were elected from single-member constituencies; Abomey, Ouidah and Porto-Novo. However, the franchise was extremely restricted.

Campaign
In Porto-Novo, Augustin Nicoué campaigned against the school enrollment restrictions. He had previously been close to the councillors supported by La Voix, but became an ardent critic of the city's Administrative Council member, Casimir d'Almeida.

Results
Despite Nicoué's campaign, Casimir d'Almeida was re-elected.

References

1932 elections in Africa
1932
1932 in French Dahomey
1932